Pedro Henrique de Santana Almeida (born 28 March 1991), known as just Pedro Henrique, is a Brazilian professional footballer who plays as a forward.

Honours
ACS Poli Timișoara
Liga II: 2014–15
Cupa Ligii runner-up: 2016–17

References

External links
 Official ACS Poli profile 
 

Sportspeople from Bahia
Living people
1991 births
Brazilian footballers
Brazilian expatriate footballers
Association football forwards
CR Vasco da Gama players
Sport Club Internacional players
S.C. Freamunde players
G.D. Estoril Praia players
S.C. Covilhã players
Galícia Esporte Clube players
ACS Poli Timișoara players
Daejeon Hana Citizen FC players
Petaling Jaya City FC players
Manama Club players
Sertãozinho Futebol Clube players
Sociedade Esportiva do Gama players
Liga I players
Liga II players
K League 2 players
Expatriate footballers in Portugal
Expatriate footballers in Romania
Expatriate footballers in South Korea
Expatriate footballers in Malaysia
Expatriate footballers in Bahrain
Brazilian expatriate sportspeople in Portugal
Brazilian expatriate sportspeople in Romania
Brazilian expatriate sportspeople in South Korea
Brazilian expatriate sportspeople in Malaysia
Brazilian expatriate sportspeople in Bahrain